Cuando tú no estás (When You Aren't Here) (1997) is the fourteenth studio album by Mexican rock and blues band El Tri. The main single is "Virgen Morena" a hymn to the Mary Virgin with the cooperation of Carlos Santana; also in "Muchacho Chicho" renowned Mexican comedian Victor Trujillo gives an introduction as his main character Brozo. The album was nominated for a Grammy Award in the Best Latin Rock album category.

Track listing
All tracks by Alex Lora except where noted.

 "Virgen Morena" (Brown-Skinned Virgin) – 4:34
 "Correteando el Bolillo" (Chasing the bolillo) (Lora, Eduardo Toral) – 3:30
 "Parece Fácil" (It Looks Easy) – 4:33
 "Epidemia" (Epidemic) – 4:27
 "Pastillas de Rocanrol" (Rock`n Roll pills) – 3:27
 "El Ritmo del Mundo" (The world's rhythm) – 3:25
 "Cuando Tú No Estás" (When You Aren't Here) – 4:23
 "Copias Piratas" (Fake Copies) – 4:10
 "Echa Tus Broncas a la Basura" (Throw Your Problems Away) – 3:15
 "Esclavo del Rocanrol" (Slave of Rock`n Roll) (Rodrigo Levario, Lora) – 3:14
 "De Todos Modos Juan Te Llamas" (You Are Named John Anyway) – 3:40
 "El Muchacho Chicho" (The Neat Guy) – 5:05

Personnel
 Alex Lora – bass, vocals, producer, mixing
 Rafael Salgado – harmonic
 Eduardo Chico – guitar
 Oscar Zarate – guitar
 Chela Lora – backing vocals
 Ramon Perez – drums
 Lalo Toral – piano
 Ronnie Laws – saxophone
 Román Martínez – art direction, design
 Jorge Romero – art direction, design, photography
 Carlos Santana – guitar in "Virgen Morena"
 Ricardo Trabulsi – photography
 Victor Trujillo – introduction in "Muchacho Chicho"
Chuck Johnson – mixing, mixing assistant, percussion
Richard Kaplan – engineer, mixing

References

External links
www.eltri.com.mx
Virgen Morena at MusicBrainz
[ Virgen Morena] at AllMusic

El Tri albums
1997 albums
Warner Music Group albums